The City Of Derry Jazz And Big Band Festival is a jazz festival held annually in Derry, Northern Ireland. It started in 2002 and is funded by Derry City and Strabane District Council, Guinness and the Department for Communities and is supported by BBC Radio Foyle and BBC Radio Ulster. It also features some blues and is one of the leading annual music events in Ireland.

Memorable performances
The 2009 Festival, Jools Holland and Rhythm & Blues Orchestra performed in The Millennium Forum.
Moncef Genoud performed in the Playhouse in 2009.

See also
 
List of jazz festivals

References

External links
City Of Derry Jazz And Big Band Festival
BBC - Northern Ireland - Radio Foyle - City Of Derry Jazz Festival 

Music festivals established in 2002
Music festivals in Northern Ireland
Jazz festivals in the United Kingdom
Blues festivals in the United Kingdom